Osinovaya Gar is a rural locality (a village) in Vakhnevskoye Rural Settlement, Nikolsky District, Vologda Oblast, Russia. The population was 59 as of 2002.

Geography 
Osinovaya Gar is located 55 km northwest of Nikolsk (the district's administrative centre) by road. Orlovo is the nearest rural locality.

References 

Rural localities in Nikolsky District, Vologda Oblast